There are three unincorporated communities named State Line in the U.S. state of Pennsylvania:

State Line, Bedford County, Pennsylvania
State Line, Erie County, Pennsylvania
State Line, Franklin County, Pennsylvania